Terry Mohajir is the current athletic director at the University of Central Florida (UCF). He was formerly the athletic director at Arkansas State University. He graduated from Arkansas State in 1993 with a major in sports management and a minor in marketing. He is a former Assistant Head Coach at the University of Kansas Jayhawks.

References

External links
 Arkansas State profile

Year of birth missing (living people)
Living people
Arkansas State Red Wolves athletic directors
Arkansas State Red Wolves football players
College Football Playoff Selection Committee members
Kansas Jayhawks football coaches
UCF Knights athletic directors
Sportspeople from Overland Park, Kansas
University of Kansas alumni 
Coaches of American football from Kansas
Players of American football from Kansas